Fauntleroy is the main character in the children's novel Little Lord Fauntleroy.

Fauntleroy may also refer to:

 Fauntleroy (surname)
 Fauntleroy (play), a play by John Augustus Stone
 Fauntleroy, Seattle, Washington, United States
 Fauntleroy Creek,  a stream in the Fauntleroy neighborhood of West Seattle, Seattle, Washington
 Fauntleroy Way SW, a main arterial in West Seattle, Seattle

See also
 Little Lord Fauntleroy (disambiguation)
 Donald Fauntleroy Duck, an animated cartoon and comic-book character
 Fauntleroy Fox, a character in The Fox and the Crow cartoons